Pudhiya Vazhkai is a 1971 Indian Tamil-language film,  directed by C. V. Rajendran. The film stars Jaishankar, R. Muthuraman, Nagesh, Jayabharathi and A. Sakunthala.

Cast
Jaishankar as Shankar
Jayabharathi as Vijaya
Nagesh as Ramesh
R. Muthuraman as Raju
A. Sakunthala as Kalpana
S. V. Sahasranamam
V. K. Ramasamy
T. S. B. K. Moulee
Sachu
V. Vasantha
V. Thilagam
"Baby" Dolly as Shanthi
Jayanthi as Uma (Guest Appearance)
Pandari Bai (Guest Appearance)

Soundtrack
The music was composed by K. V. Mahadevan.

References

External links
 

1971 films
Films scored by M. S. Viswanathan
1970s Tamil-language films